William Samuel Bussell (19 February 1887 – 7 June 1917) was a New Zealand rugby league player who represented New Zealand. Bussell was killed in action during World War I.

Personal life
Bussell was the son of William and Hester Bussell and lived in St Albans, Christchurch.

Playing career
In 1912 Bussell was part of the first ever Canterbury side. Canterbury went down 4-5 to Wellington on 7 September.

In 1914 he played for Sydenham in the Canterbury Rugby League competition and also captained Canterbury before being selected to represent New Zealand against the Great Britain Lions. New Zealand lost the Test match 13-16. He was selected for the 1915 New Zealand tour of Australia that was later abandoned.

World War I
With the outbreak of World War I, Bussell enlisted. In 1917 Private Bussell was killed in action during the Battle of Messines.

References

New Zealand rugby league players
New Zealand national rugby league team players
Canterbury rugby league team players
Sydenham Swans players
Rugby league halfbacks
1917 deaths
New Zealand military personnel killed in World War I
New Zealand Army personnel
1887 births
Rugby league players from Christchurch